Zubirán is a surname. Notable people with the surname include:

Salvador Zubirán (1898–1998), Mexican physician and nutritionist
Rafael Zubirán Capmany (1875–1948), Mexican politician and former secretary of the Interior